William "Buck" Washer (October 11, 1882 – December 8, 1955) was an American professional baseball pitcher. Washer played for the Philadelphia Phillies in the  season. In one career game, he had a 0–0 record, giving up two runs, four hits, and also gave up five walks. He batted and threw right-handed.

Washer attended West Virginia University, where he played college baseball for the Mountaineers in 1902.

Washer was born and died in Akron, Ohio.

References

1882 births
1955 deaths
Philadelphia Phillies players
Baseball players from Akron, Ohio
Toledo Mud Hens players
Ottumwa Packers players
Scottdale Millers players
Grafton Wanderers players
West Virginia Mountaineers baseball players